The ZEC Chapais is a "zone d'exploitation contrôlée" (controlled harvesting zone) (ZEC) located within the municipality of Mont-Carmel and the unorganized territory of Petit-Lac-Sainte-Anne in the (RCM) Kamouraska Regional County Municipality, in the administrative region of Bas-Saint-Laurent, in Quebec, in Canada.

Geography 

Zec extends to the American border where she shares the border of 12 km; while on the American side (State of Maine), an equivalent and related protected territory extends south for 5.3 km.

ZEC has 12 lakes (six of which operated for sport fishing) and six rivers, all operated for recreative fishing. The main water bodies of the ZEC are: "East Lake" (French: "Lac de l'Est"), the "Five Miles Lake" (French: "Lac des Cinq Milles")," Lost Lake (French: Lac Perdu), the "Lake of the Marais" (French: Lac des Marais), the Tinoute Lake and Lake boiler (French: lac Chaudière). The territory of the ZEC is crossed in its center by the Wolfe River (French: Rivière du Loup, which flows north to go to pour on the southeast of the St. Lawrence River shoreline. Its tributary Manie River (Frenche: "rivière Manie") drains the northeastern part of the territory of the ZEC.

Southwest side, near the US border, the "Mountain Tour" (French: "Montagne de la Tour") (elevation: 644 m) and the "Mountain of the Five Miles" (French: "Montagne des Cinq Milles") (elevation: 585 m) peak of the surrounding territory.

The three entrance stations are located: Lac Ste Anne, Saint-Omer and "Brittany". ZEC has two campsites accessible by car: Lac Ste Anne (southwest) and "Lac Chaudière" (at north).

Wildlife 

This controlled harvesting zone has about a dozen small lakes populated mostly of brook trout and char.

Major lakes on the ZEC, which are authorized for the recreative fishing are: "étang de l'écluse" (pond of the Lock) (with an access ramp to the water), "Lac Blanc" (White Lake), lake Chaudière, lake Davison, lake Grosse truite (with an access ramp to the water), lake of the President, lake Sainte-Anne and the Little lake Sainte-Anne. Certain rules of daily contingency fishery apply depending on the time of year, the lakes, the type of gear... Anglers can learn about the rules by visiting the official website of the ZEC: Official site of the ZEC.

On the territory of the ZEC, the hunting contingency is on for moose, the black bear and small animal. Contingency reflects the particular hunting seasons depending on the species of animal, the type of gear hunting (archery, firearm, collar...), sex of the animals (or calves).

Toponymy 

The designation of this area is related to the toponym of the township and village nearby. This gazetteer designation was chosen in memory of Jean-Charles Chapais (1811-1885), who was a businessman and a Quebec politician. He is considered one of the fathers of the Canadian Confederation for his participation in the Quebec Conference, 1864 to determine the shape of the future Government of Canada.

The toponym "ZEC Chapais" was formalized on August 5, 1982 at the Bank of place names in the Commission de toponymie du Québec (Geographical Names Board of Québec).

See also

References

Related articles 
 St. Lawrence River
 Bas-Saint-Laurent, administrative region of Quebec
 Kamouraska Regional County Municipality
 La Pocatière, a municipality
 Saint-Omer
 Sainte-Perpétue, l'Islet
 Mont-Carmel
 Notre Dame Mountains, chain of mountains
 Zone d'exploitation contrôlée (Controlled Harvesting Zone) (ZEC)

Protected areas of Bas-Saint-Laurent
Protected areas established in 1978
1978 establishments in Quebec